Ahmad Abdollahzadeh is an Iranian football midfielder who currently plays for the Iranian football club, Foolad.

Club career

Foolad
Abdollahzadeh started his career with Foolad in his teenage years. Later, he was placed on the first team by Majid Jalali. He made his debut for Foolad in the first fixture of the 2014–15 season against Tractor as a starter.

Club career statistics

International career

Youth
He played two matches at the 2010 AFC U-16 Championship. He was also part of the U-20 team during the 2012 AFC U-19 Championship.

Senior
On 3 October 2014, he was invited to the Iran national football team by Carlos Queiroz for the upcoming camp in Portugal. He made his debut against Togo on 5 October 2017. In May 2018, he was named in Iran’s preliminary squad for the 2018 World Cup in Russia but did not make it to the final 23.

Honors

Club
Foolad
Iran Pro League (1): 2013–14
Hazfi Cup (1): 2020–21
Iranian Super Cup: 2021

References

External links
 Ahmad Abdollahzadeh at PersianLeague.com
 Ahmad Abdollahzadeh at IranLeague.ir

1993 births
Living people
People from Andimeshk
Iranian footballers
Association football midfielders
Foolad FC players
Tractor S.C. players
Iran under-20 international footballers
Sportspeople from Khuzestan province